Walnut Street Historic District is a historic district in Chaska, Minnesota, United States, listed on the National Register of Historic Places.  The district is roughly bounded by Walnut, Second, Chestnut, and Sixth Streets.  It contains burial mounds representing the area's prehistory, and the buildings and structures in the district represent Chaska's period of commercial, industrial, religious, and residential development.  Houses within this district include the Greek Revival style and other Neoclassical styles.

References

External links

1980 establishments in Minnesota
Chaska, Minnesota
Geography of Carver County, Minnesota
Greek Revival architecture in Minnesota
Historic districts on the National Register of Historic Places in Minnesota
National Register of Historic Places in Carver County, Minnesota